Albanian Alternative is a political party representing the Albanian minority in Montenegro.

The party is led by Nik Gjeloshaj. At the legislative elections in Montenegro, in October 2012, AA won 1 out of 81 seats. Between 2009 and 2016, the party was a constituent member of the Albanian Coalition.

History
In September 2016, the Albanian Alternative agreed to form a pre-election alliance with New Democratic Power – FORCA and Democratic Union of Albanians (DUA) for 2016 elections. The coalition won one seat in the election, which was allocated to a member of FORCA.

Electoral results

Parliamentary elections

See also
Albanians Decisively

References

Albanian political parties in Montenegro
Albanian nationalism
Conservative parties in Montenegro
National conservative parties
Pro-European political parties in Montenegro
Right-wing parties in Europe